Jiang Xinyu and Tang Qianhui were the two-time defending champions, but lost in the semifinals to Peng Shuai and Zhang Shuai.

Wang Xinyu and Zhu Lin won the title, defeating Peng and Zhang in the final, 6–2, 7–6(7–5).

Seeds

Draw

Draw

References

External links
Draw

Jiangxi International Women's Tennis Open - Women's Doubles
2019 Women's Doubles